Events during the year 1107 in Italy.

Deaths
 Robert I of Loritello

Births
 Enrico Dandolo

References 

Years of the 12th century in Italy
Italy
Italy